Ro-318220 is a protein kinase C (PKC) inhibitor of the bisindolylmaleimide class.

References

Protein kinase inhibitors
Bisindolylmaleimides